Clubul Sportiv Municipal Făgăraș, commonly known as CSM Făgăraș, is a men's handball team from Făgăraș, Brașov County, Romania. The club was founded in 2015 and promoted for the first time in Liga Națională after only one season.

Kits

Honours
Divizia A:
Winners  (1): 2016

Team 2019-20

Goalkeepers
  Ștefan Grigoraș
 01  Radu Ivanov
 16  Răzvan Vîlceanu
Wingers
8  Bogdan Dincă
 14  Claudiu Mînea
 21  Tiberiu Constantinescu
 42  Alin Câmpan
  Cătălin Furak
Line players
 17  Alexandru Dedu
  Leonard Ștefan
 19  George Roșca

Backs
LB
5  Cosmin Capotă
 41  Ciprian Vancea

CB
 10  Emilian Turcu
 13  Răzvan Mateoniu
RB
 27   Nicolae Ungureanu
 34  Marius Bahan

References

External links
  

Romanian handball clubs
Handball clubs established in 2015
2015 establishments in Romania
Liga Națională (men's handball)
Divizia A (men's handball)
Făgăraș